505, previously known as 505 CST and Paramount, is a residential skyscraper in downtown Nashville, Tennessee, located at the intersection of Fifth Avenue and Church Street. 505 stands on the location originally intended for the cancelled Signature Tower. Other planned areas include three retail spaces including an  ground-level restaurant, a  amenity level, and 690 parking spaces. It is expected to cost . The architect is Solomon Cordwell Buenz.

Preleasing opened in November 2016, with rents ranging from $1,500 to $6,300 per month (excluding penthouses). The building topped out on May 18, 2017, and opened to its first tenants on October 1, 2017 in advance of completion in January 2018. Initially, no sales are planned for 505. The investment and financing arrangements, including an investment from a real estate investment trust, do not allow for sales during construction.

505 was named Best New Skyscraper in the 2017 Nashville Scene "Best of Nashville" awards.

See also 
List of tallest buildings in Nashville

References

External links 
 
 Giarratana Development

Skyscrapers in Nashville, Tennessee
Residential buildings completed in 2018